Little Germany, Ontario can mean the following:

Little Germany, Grey County, Ontario
Little Germany, Northumberland County, Ontario